Khulan may refer to:
 Khulan, a Mongolian word for a subspecies of the onager called the Mongolian wild ass, Equus hemionus hemionus,
 Khulan, a common female name in Mongolia:
 Khulan khatun ( – ), wife of Genghis Khan
 Khulan (wife of Anatole)
 Chuluuny Khulan, Mongolian actress
 Khashbatyn Khulan, Mongolian politician

See also 
 Kulan (disambiguation)